Sunshine Acres is a rural locality in the Fraser Coast Region, Queensland, Australia.

Geography
Stockyard Creek, a tributary of the Susan River, rises in the locality.

Road infrastructure
Maryborough–Hervey Bay Road (State Route 57) runs along the western boundary.

References 

Fraser Coast Region
Localities in Queensland